Jack Hughes (January 30, 1890 – June 27, 1962) was a Canadian ice hockey centreman from Winnipeg, Manitoba. He coached the Winnipegs to the Olympic title in 1932.

Awards and achievements
Allan Cup Championships (1913, 1928, & 1931)
Turnbull Cup MJHL Championship (1931)
Memorial Cup Championship (1931)
"Honoured Member" of the Manitoba Hockey Hall of Fame

External links
Jack Hughes's biography at Manitoba Hockey Hall of Fame

1890 births
1962 deaths
Canada men's national ice hockey team coaches
Canadian ice hockey centres
Medalists at the 1932 Winter Olympics
Olympic gold medalists for Canada
Ice hockey people from Winnipeg
Winnipeg Hockey Club players